Queletia is a genus of fungi in the family Agaricaceae. The genus was described by Elias Magnus Fries in 1872. Fruit bodies of Queletia species are roughly spherical with a stipe-like base. They have a thin outer skin (peridium) and a harder inner skin that breaks into small pieces with age. The genus is named after French mycologist Lucien Quélet (1832-1899).

The genus was circumscribed in Öfvers. Förh. Kongl. Svenska Vetensk.-Akad. vol.28 on page 171 in 1872.

3 species, including;
 Queletia andina 
 Queletia mirabilis 
 Queletia turcestanica 

Former species;
 Q. laceratum  now Schizostoma laceratum
 Q. mundkurii  now Schizostoma mundkurii

See also
List of Agaricales genera
List of Agaricaceae genera

References

Agaricaceae
Agaricales genera